Azzano Decimo is a comune (municipality) in the Province of Pordenone in the Italian region Friuli Venezia Giulia, located about  northwest of Trieste and about  southeast of Pordenone.

The municipality of Azzano Decimo contains the frazioni (subdivisions, mainly villages and hamlets) Corva, Fagnigola, and Tiezzo.

Azzano Decimo borders the following municipalities: Chions, Fiume Veneto, Pasiano di Pordenone, Pordenone, Pravisdomini.

Demographic evolution

People
Hubert Badanai
Mario Peressin

References

External links
 www.comune.azzanodecimo.pn.it

Cities and towns in Friuli-Venezia Giulia